The Rhonelle is a river of northern France. It is a right tributary of the Scheldt. Its source is near Locquignol. It flows generally northwest along Le Quesnoy, Villers-Pol and Famars. It flows into the Scheldt in Valenciennes.

References

Rivers of France
Rivers of Nord (French department)
Rivers of Hauts-de-France